Michaël Parkinson (born 23 November 1991) is a Dutch professional volleyball player. He is a member of the Netherlands national team. At the professional club level, he plays for Tours VB.

Honours

Clubs
 National championships
 2010/2011  Dutch Championship, with Rivium Rotterdam
 2011/2012  Belgian SuperCup, with Noliko Maaseik
 2011/2012  Belgian Cup, with Noliko Maaseik
 2011/2012  Belgian Championship, with Noliko Maaseik
 2012/2013  Belgian SuperCup, with Noliko Maaseik
 2019/2020  French Cup, with Stade Poitevin Poitiers

References

External links

 
 Player profile at PlusLiga.pl 
 Player profile at Volleybox.net 

1991 births
Living people
Sportspeople from Reading, Berkshire
Dutch men's volleyball players
Dutch expatriate sportspeople in Belgium
Expatriate volleyball players in Belgium
Dutch expatriate sportspeople in Germany
Expatriate volleyball players in Germany
Dutch expatriate sportspeople in France
Expatriate volleyball players in France
Dutch expatriate sportspeople in Romania
Expatriate volleyball players in Romania
Dutch expatriate sportspeople in Poland
Expatriate volleyball players in Poland 
Czarni Radom players
Tours Volley-Ball players
Middle blockers